DeAndre Lamount Haynes (born March 30, 1984) is an assistant basketball coach under Coach Shaka Smart at Marquette University. He is a former American basketball player and former assistant coach at the University of Maryland.

Haynes, a 6'2" point guard from Detroit, Michigan, came to Kent State from Southwestern High School in Detroit.  Playing for the Golden Flashes from 2002 to 2006, Haynes scored 1,259 points and left as the school's all-time leader in assists (625) and steals (229).  In his senior season of 2005–06, Haynes averaged 13 points per game and was named Mid-American Conference Player of the Year and an honorable mention All-American by the Associated Press.  He led the Golden Flashes to regular-season and MAC championships that season.

After graduation, Haynes was not selected in the 2006 NBA draft.  He instead signed in Belgium and played for the next six seasons in Belgium, Hungary, Germany and Finland.

Haynes retired from basketball in 2012 and became an assistant coach at Kent State under head coach Rob Senderoff. Following the 2015–16 season, he moved to a similar role at fellow MAC program Toledo. After joining the Illinois State Redbirds staff for a few months, he was hired by Michigan to serve as an assistant coach in August 2017.

References

External links
 Kent State coaching bio
 FIBA.com profile
 Finnish League profile

1984 births
Living people
American expatriate basketball people in Belgium
American expatriate basketball people in Finland
American expatriate basketball people in Germany
American expatriate basketball people in Hungary
American men's basketball coaches
American men's basketball players
Basketball players from Detroit
Kent State Golden Flashes men's basketball coaches
Kent State Golden Flashes men's basketball players
Maryland Terrapins men's basketball coaches
Michigan Wolverines men's basketball coaches
Okapi Aalstar players
Paderborn Baskets players
Point guards
Toledo Rockets men's basketball coaches